Taihang Tunnel is the third-longest mountain railway tunnel in northern China, after the New Guanjiao and West Qinling tunnels. It is a double track tunnel that was built to allow the Shijiazhuang–Taiyuan high-speed railway to cross  the Taihang Mountains. Construction on the tunnel began on 11 June 2005 and the tunnel was opened on 22 December 2007.

The Shijiazhuang–Taiyuan high-speed railway is the line linking Shijiazhuang, the capital of Hebei province, and Taiyuan, the capital of Shanxi province. After the opening of the Taihang Tunnel and completion of the high-speed railway, the travel time from Shijiazhuang to Taiyuan was reduced from almost six hours to one hour.

References

Railway tunnels in China
Rail transport in Shanxi
Tunnels completed in 2007